Waman Wayi (Quechua waman falcon, Ancash Quechua wayi house, "falcon house", also spelled Huamanhuay) is a mountain in the Andes of Peru which reaches a height of approximately . It is located in the Ancash Region, Huari Province, San Marcos District.

References 

Mountains of Peru
Mountains of Ancash Region